BR-282 is a federal highway in the southern Brazilian state of Santa Catarina. The highway goes the entire length of the state from the state capital, Florianópolis on the Atlantic Ocean in the east, 680.6 km westward to the town of Paraíso on the border with Argentina.

Economic importance 
The highway is one of the main in the state of Santa Catarina, connecting the interior to the coastal ports. The areas around Chapecó and Concórdia, with population of Germanic descent, concentrate the largest production of pork in the country and are home to companies such as Sadia, Perdigão and Seara, which became the multinationals BRF and JBS. Although the highway reaches the border with Argentina, there is still no large movement of goods between countries in the region.

Gallery

References

Federal highways in Brazil